The Titus is an infantry mobility vehicle developed and built by Nexter and Tatra Defence Vehicle.

Design
The Titus is based on a Tatra chassis.

Operators
 Albanian Land Force : "2-16" vehicles are currently trialed and to enter service soon.
 Czech Army : 62 vehicles ordered in 2017.
 RAID & BRI, trials in 2016 but no order since.

References

External links
Titus Technical data sheet - specifications - pictures

Armoured personnel carriers
Nexter Systems
Military vehicles introduced in the 2010s